The 1990 Japanese motorcycle Grand Prix was the first round of the 1990 Grand Prix motorcycle racing season. It took place on the weekend of 23–25 March 1990 at the Suzuka Circuit.

500 cc race report
Wayne Rainey's pole of 2:09.589 is the first sub-2:10 lap at Suzuka. Rainey gets the start of the new 4-column grid, followed by Mick Doohan, Eddie Lawson and the field. Rainey goes through the chicane with a sub-second gap, followed by Lawson, Doohan, Kevin Schwantz and Wayne Gardner.

Rainey is opening a gap, but Schwantz moves into second and leads the chase. Entering the back straight, Schwantz looks behind him to see who's back there, but Lawson's proximity probably blocks the view.

Perhaps Schwantz had a feeling something bad was about to happen. Going into 130R, Gardner barely manages to pass on the brakes and move into second place, while Doohan brakes for all he's worth, getting the back wheel in the air, and loses the front end as he leans it in. Unfortunately, he's inside of Lawson when he falls, so Doohan's bike hits Lawson's rear wheel hard, taking him out too. Lawson, who came out of 1989 without a race crash, begins the season with a DNF and a broken left ankle.

Rainey has a large gap, and Gardner and Schwantz are scraping fairings for second.

Last lap and Rainey has an untouchable lead, and Gardner goes slightly wide heading towards the chicane, but manages to hold Schwantz off; as they flick it right and then left, Schwantz touches Gardner's back tire and drops his bike. Because it happened at such a low speed, Schwantz is able to get back on quickly and still cross the line in third place.

Schwantz: "I thought I had Gardner sorted out pretty good for the last lap going into the chicane. Just as soon as I got up the inside and he saw my wheel, he came in and I think he was still going in too fast. He went into the chicane real deep. I got turned quick because I knew he was going to be wide. He came back across and as I was coming down, we hit. I guess it all depends on how you look at it as to  fault it was. I'd say it was his."

500 cc classification

References

Japanese motorcycle Grand Prix
Japanese
Motorcycle